Guárico may refer to:

Places
Haiti
 Cap-Haïtien, Haiti's northernmost important city, whose region the natives historically called Guárico.

Venezuela
 Guárico, one of the 23 states which make up the country
 Guárico Reservoir, a reservoir in the state of Guárico
 Guárico River
 Parroquia Guárico, a parroquia in the state of Lara